Eternal Champions is a 1993 fighting game developed and published by Sega for the Sega Genesis. It was one of the few fighting games of its time developed from the ground up as a home console title, rather than being released in arcades first and later ported to home systems.

Sega released Eternal Champions in hopes of capitalizing on the fighting game mania that the game industry was in the midst of following the massive success of Street Fighter II (1991) and Mortal Kombat (1992). The game tried to set itself apart with unique features such as a heavier emphasis on its story, characters pulled from different time periods, reflectable projectiles, force fields, fighters that carried weapons, a training mode where players had to defend themselves against robotic traps, a novel method of executing moves, and elaborate stage-specific finishing moves called "Overkills".

Two years later, an enhanced version, Eternal Champions: Challenge from the Dark Side, was released for the Sega CD. The game also spawned two spin-off games, Chicago Syndicate and X-Perts. Eternal Champions was added to the Wii's Virtual Console download service on December 3, 2007, and included with the Sega Genesis Mini microconsole released in 2019.

Gameplay

The game followed the typical eight-way directional pad/stick with six-button layout common to most fighting games at the time (more commonly in this case, Street Fighter II). Since the standard Mega Drive/Genesis controller has only three action buttons, players would have to purchase a six-button controller or Sega Activator, or else use the start button to toggle the action buttons between punches and kicks. The joystick or D-pad is used to move away, towards, jump and crouch. There are three punches and three kicks that vary based upon speed and power. The weakest punches and kicks are fast but do minimal damage, medium attacks are a balanced mix of recovery speed and damage, and strong attacks are the most powerful but recover the slowest. Attacks can be blocked by pressing away (for high attacks) or down and away (for low attacks). Grapples are executed by standing close to an opponent and pressing toward or away and using either the medium or the strong punch button. These attacks cannot be blocked or escaped.

Each character has their own unique special attacks that are performed differently from those of other characters. If a character is hit several times in a row they become "dizzy" and their opponent can land a free attack. In Eternal Champions, all special move commands are performed by either pressing multiple buttons together, or holding back or down to charge and then pressing towards or up together with a button. There are no rolling motions in this game, and a given special move may only be performed with a specific button.

As seen in Art of Fighting released the previous year, Eternal Champions has a "special attack meter" that decreases each time a character performs a special move such as a projectile; different special attacks decrease the meter by different amounts and the characters each have a taunt move that decreases their opponent's special attack meter as well. Characters can retreat into a defensive shell to recharge their meter. In tournament mode (the main single player mode), the computer opponent can do special moves even after its meter has reached zero.

The game introduces stage-specific finishing moves called Overkills. These are performed by defeating an opponent such that they fall upon a certain area of ground. If they land in the right spot, the life bars disappear and some element of the background kills them.

Plot
An omniscient being known as the Eternal Champion predicts that mankind will soon fade from existence due to the untimely and unjust deaths of key individuals throughout history who were destined for greatness. Seeking to restore balance to the world, the Eternal Champion gathers these souls from time moments before their deaths. The Eternal Champion only has enough power to restore life to one of these individuals, so he organizes and holds a fighting tournament between them, where the victor will be able to regain their life and change their fate while bringing balance to the universe, whilst the losers will be forced to die just as history recorded.

Unlike most fighting games, or video games in general, there are no characters in this game who are "bad" or "evil". Each character has been chosen because he or she is either inherently good or has the potential to do great good and change the course of history for the better. Despite the ability to kill opponents in this game, it is not relevant to the story. Much like games such as Mortal Kombat (which pioneered finishing moves in fighting games), the game's "Overkills" have no impact on the story and are simply a gameplay element for the enjoyment of the player. It is actually revealed in a few character endings that some of the fighters become allies or friends during the course of the tournament.

Fighters
The game features nine playable characters. Beating arcade mode with any character reveals an epilogue detailing how the winner avoided their original death and then went on to make a positive change in their era.

Blade – Jonathan Blade is a Syrian bounty hunter from 2030 AD. He was hired by the government to help track down a terrorist that had stolen a lethal virus. Blade was about to apprehend the terrorist when special forces agents opened fire on both of them, accidentally causing the terrorist to drop the vial and release the virus.
Jetta – Jetta Maxx is a member of Russian aristocracy from 1899 AD. She was working undercover as a circus acrobat at the time of her death. A boxer revolutionary tampered with her tightrope equipment ahead of a major show in China. She fell to her death in front of the live crowd. When her true identity was revealed, it heightened tensions between both nations.
Larcen – Larcen Tyler is a former cat-burglar from 1920s Chicago. He used to do jobs for a local crime boss. He was hired to plant evidence in the hospital room of a rival mafia leader. It was only when he got to the location that he discovered that his real target was the Chief of Police, and the "evidence" was actually a bomb. Larcen was killed in the explosion that destroyed most of the hospital.
Midknight – Midknight is a vampire-like mutant hiding in Vietnam. In his former life, he was the noted British biochemist Mitchell Middleton Knight. He was hired by U.S. forces to spike water supplies during the Vietnam War in 1967. He became exposed to the chemical, and was mutated like every other victim. He was killed by a vampire hunter hired by the government before he could create a cure.
R.A.X. – R.A.X. Coswell is an American cyber-kickboxer from 2345 AD. His trainer programmed a virus into his R.A.X. exoskeleton software to ensure he lost an important match.  Coswell died during the match as a result.
Shadow – Shadow Yamato is a ninja assassin from modern-day (1993 AD) Japan. She was thrown off the top of her employer’s skyscraper before she could publicly expose the murderous actions of her syndicate.
Slash – Slash is a prehistoric hunter from 50,000 BC. He was sentenced to death by the elders of his tribe who feared that Slash would use his high intelligence to usurp them.
Trident – An artificial being created by the Atlanteans from 110 BC. He was killed by a rival before he could compete in the final match of a gladiator tournament. As a consequence, the Roman Empire banished his race to the sea where they were eventually wiped out.
Xavier – Xavier Pendragon was an alchemy student from 1692 AD. He was executed under a false charge of witchcraft during the Salem Witch Trials.

The Eternal Champion appears as a non-playable boss character.

All of the characters returned in the sequel Eternal Champions: Challenge from the Darkside.

Development
Though only credited within the game under "special thanks", veteran comic book artist Ernie Chan created much of the character designs and art for the game.

Release
The cartridge was the second "packaged game" to be included with the Sega Activator, an elaborate infrared ring controller that players stood in and punched and kicked in order to make the characters perform different combat movements. It was one of only a few games that actually recognized the Activator and took advantage of most of the features of the unit. The player using the Activator was given an advantage of receiving 50% less and inflicting 50% more damage than the player using a regular controller.

Promotion and other media
A Slurpee flavor entitled "Sega Eternal Champions Cherry" was once available in 7-Eleven stores throughout the United States. It came in cups with pictures of the characters on them, and the bottom of the cup contained a temporary tattoo. There was also a special cash and rebate promotion in July 1993 that was featured on MTV. Electronic Gaming Monthly sponsored Eternal Champions tournaments in the United States as part of a roaming video game show. The game, however, was not yet completed so the participants were only given the choice of four characters to play as: Shadow, R.A.X, Larcen and Slash.

Two gamebooks, titled Eternal Champions Adventure Gamebook: The Cyber Warriors and Eternal Champions Adventure Gamebook 2: Citadel of Chaos, were released by Puffin Books. In the books, the reader controls the newest Champion and travels through time helping the game characters battle a megalomaniacal artificial intelligence called the Overlord, who is bent on replacing them with duplicates so that they cannot change the course of history for the better. Both books were released as sticker albums by Panini in 1993.

Eternal Champions was adapted by the UK Sega Magazine's Sonic the Comic in a stand-alone magazine Eternal Champions Special, which introduced the main characters and served as an adaptation to the game. The characters also appeared in two stories in the main Sonic the Comic series, first in Eternal Champions (issues 19-24) and then Larcen's Revenge (issues 37–40) which dealt with the professional thief Larcen Tyler returning to 1920s Chicago and working with the female ninja Shadow Yamoto to take down the crime boss who killed him. Eternal Champions was the only non-Sonic-related Sega property to receive a special issue of Sonic the Comic.

Eternal Champions: Special Moves Edition
Eternal Champions: Special Moves Edition is a handheld game by Tiger and is a part of the Sega Tiger Electronic Pocket Arcade game series. The game is essentially a smaller and simpler version of Eternal Champions. It includes all nine characters and the Eternal Champion as a playable character. This version has three different types of gameplay, one-on-one, one against three, and team battle.

Reception
In the United Kingdom, it was the top-selling Mega Drive game in February 1994.

Upon the game's release, Eternal Champions was given a mixed reception, and held an average aggregate score of 62.5% at GameRankings at the time of the site's 2019 closure. Mean Machines Sega gave it a score of 97%, calling it "at least as good" as Street Fighter II, and Electronic Games gave it a 91%. The four reviewers of Electronic Gaming Monthly were divided, with two of them recommending the game based on the large number of options and the selection of moves, while the other two described it as a major disappointment, citing mediocre graphics and unexciting characters. They gave the game a 6.25 out of 10 average, with individual reviewer scores ranging from 5 to 8.

In 2008, IGN gave the Virtual Console release a score of 6 out of 10, criticizing its difficult to learn play mechanics while praising the game's story, training mode, and "inner strength meter". IGN concluded "it's not likely that many players who've never previously heard of the game will have the patience to spend that much time getting to know it."

In 1995, Mega Zone included the game on their Top 50 Games In History summarizing: "Huge characters and heaps of playability put it up their with MKII and SFII." In 2006, IGN ranked the game's finishing moves ("Overkills") as the best gore effects in video game history. In 2011, Complex included it on the list of ten "most blatant Mortal Kombat ripoffs" but added that it was "one of the more successful faux-MK fighters" and "the only thing that sucked was the difficulty." Complex also featured it on the 2012 list of the 25 Sega franchises they would like to see revisited and ranked it as the 24th best 2D fighting game of all time in 2013.

Legacy
Though Eternal Champions saw strong sales and was at one point a popular enough property to warrant a sequel, a remake, two spin-offs, and various multimedia tie-ins, after the planned third game in the core fighting series was cancelled Sega has not produced any new product for the franchise. The entire series had been absent from the compilations of Sega Genesis games that have been released on various platforms over the years, until the first entry saw a release through Steam on September 13, 2010. Rap group Bone Thugs-N-Harmony's 1995 album E. 1999 Eternal was loosely inspired by the video game, not just in title, but even as far as the use of samples, such as the character bios theme for "Eternal", and the bad ending theme being the basis of the original "Crossroad", which would later be remixed, becoming the group's biggest single and earning them a Grammy.

Sequels

Eternal Champions: Challenge From the Dark Side kept the special attack meter but made most special attacks use less of the meter than in the previous game. Therefore, the characters gained a multitude of special attacks that did not deplete the special attack meter. Three new types of finishing moves were added in Challenge from the Dark Side: the second Overkill in each stage called Sudden Death (that could be activated when the victim still had a little life left), Vendetta, and Cinekill. Combo attacks were also introduced, jumping attacks could be linked to ground attacks and most normal attacks could be linked to other normal attacks. In addition, the game was significantly more violent and bloody than its predecessor, especially in the new finishing moves.

A third and final title Eternal Champions: The Final Chapter was advertised for the Sega Saturn, but the game was cancelled shortly after beginning production, in order to push the Virtua Fighter series in the United States. According to an interview with Michael Latham, this decision was made by Sega of Japan: "Sega of Japan felt that Eternal Champions was keeping Virtua Fighter from being more successful in the US and that it would be better if the company focused on only one franchise... and as Sega is a Japanese company, the Japan side won. It was a crushing blow and was the only time in working nearly a decade at Sega I considered quitting. I mainly stayed with the hope to change that decision, but sadly never could. Even when we did the NetFighter project for Heat.net, we weren't able to use the Eternal characters as a hidden bonus. From Japan's view, the game never existed, in spite of its stellar sales and even offers to do comic books and a cartoon around it."

Spin-offs
There are two video games which are spin-offs of the main Eternal Champions series, and are considered as being part of alternate universes to the main story of the core games, starring several popular Eternal Champions characters. The first game is Chicago Syndicate, an action game released for the Sega Game Gear portable platform in 1995. The plot is based in an alternate reality where Larcen Tyler did not die in 1920 as stated in Eternal Champions, and now seeks revenge on the Chicago Mafia. The second game, X-Perts, is a side-scrolling beat'em up released in 1996 for the Genesis. Like Chicago Syndicate, its plot is based in an alternate reality, this time one where Shadow Yamoto did not die in 1993 and instead formed a vigilante group.

References

External links
 
 Official Virtual Console website 

 
1993 video games
Martial arts video games
Mortal Kombat clones
Sega video games
Sega Games franchises
Sega Genesis games
Fighting games
Video games about death games
Video games developed in the United States
Virtual Console games
Multiplayer and single-player video games